Essex Farm may refer to:

Essex Farm, previous name of Caldicott, historic house in Somerset County, Maryland, on the National Register of Historic Places
Essex Farm Cemetery, World War I burial ground near Ypres, Belgium
Essex County Home and Farm,  historic almshouse and infirmary in Essex County, New York, on the National Register of Historic Places

See also
Essex (disambiguation)